Mali Radinci is a village in Serbia. It is situated in the Ruma municipality, in the Srem District, Vojvodina province. The village has a Serb ethnic majority and its population numbering 598 people (2002 census).

Name
The name of the town in Serbian is plural.

Historical population

1961: 643
1971: 578
1981: 574
1991: 558

See also
List of places in Serbia
List of cities, towns and villages in Vojvodina

References
Slobodan Ćurčić, Broj stanovnika Vojvodine, Novi Sad, 1996.

External links 

Mali Radinci

Populated places in Syrmia